Cui Zhongkai (born 19 May 1989) is a Chinese footballer currently playing as a right-back for Dalian Duxing.

Career statistics

Club
.

References

1989 births
Living people
Footballers from Dalian
Footballers from Liaoning
Chinese footballers
Association football defenders
China League One players
China League Two players
Tianjin Jinmen Tiger F.C. players
Beijing Sport University F.C. players
21st-century Chinese people